Soule Steel Company was a manufacturer of fabricated steel building products. The main office was in San Francisco, California with branch offices in Los Angeles, California, Portland, Oregon and Seattle, Washington. Soule Steel worked on major construction projects like: the reinforcing steel on the footings for the Golden Gate Bridge, California Memorial Stadium at University of California, Berkeley, San Francisco high rises buildings, Los Angeles Memorial Coliseum, Vincent Thomas Bridge, Space Needle and the Grand Coulee Dam. For World War II Soule Steel built landing crafts and floating derricks for seaplane moving, a class YSD-11 Class Seaplane Wrecking Derrick in the Terminal Island shipyard. Soule Steel also built steel barges for the war. After the war the shipyard built some tuna fishing ships. Soule Steel was started by Edward Soulé in 1911. Edward Soulé was a civil engineer in San Francisco and saw the damage done by the 1906 San Francisco earthquake. So, in 1911 started a steel rebar business, called Edw. L Soulé Campany to help make new buildings stronger. The company name was changed in 1927 to Soule Steel Company. The family-owned business grew and at its peak had nine 9 fabrication shops, a steel mill (1959 in Long Beach, California), a division for building steel buildings, and a steel window and doors division. Edw. L Soulé retired in 1945 and Stanley Soul continued the company, and later Edward Lee Soule Jr. (1917-2003) and his brothers: Howard Stephen Soule (1924-2010), Lee Soule and Peter Soule. Soule Steel and Zamil Steel founded a joint venture in 1930. Soule family was also a family of philanthropy and gave to many charities.  Soule Steel closed in 1986. The San Francisco plant and Portland plant are now business centers. The Wilmington Ave Los Angeles plant is now The Plaza Americana. The Seattle plant is now Ferguson Plumbing warehouse. The Phoenix site is now a food court. San Jose site is a vacant lot. Fresno site is now apartments.

Soulé Software
Third-generation Soule, Sandy Soule, started Soulé Software based in Valencia, California, which is also run by fourth-generation Soule, Kevin Soule. Soulé Software product is Contract management software, that also supports rebar fabrication and placers.

Built for World War II
Soule Steel produced tons of rebar for the war effort.

LCM(3) and LCM(6)

For the war Soule Steel built LCM(3) and LCM(6), these are Landing Craft Mechanized Mark 3 and Mark 6.

Seaplane Wrecking Derrick

Soule Steel San Francisco plant built SD-11 Class Seaplane Wrecking Derrick for the US Navy for World War 2:
YSD 60 Worked 17th Naval District for WW2, remove Navy 1 December 1977, transferred to the City of Long Beach, CA, 15 December 1999, abandoned on Terminal Island in 2008.
YSD 61 Worked 13th Naval District at Whidbey Island, remove Navy and sold on 27 October 1960 to Western Marine Construction, Inc., Seattle, WA, (ON 284150) in 1961, abandoned on Snohomish River in 2011.
YSD 62 Worked Roi, Kwajalein for WW2, move from Kwajalein to Pearl Harbor aboard Whetstone (LSD-27) in 1947. removed by 1967.
YSD 63 Worked din Guam and Saipan for WW2, worked Subic Bay, remove from Navy 16 July 1993.
YSD 64, became Sandcaster YM-31. Worked Fourteenth Naval District at Pearl Harbor, to Ulithi in 1945, Towed to Kerama Retto, Okinawa by (ARS-16) in 1945, worked Fourteenth Naval District to 1955, worked as Service Craft Unit 1 for diving school at Pearl in 1958, made YM-31 in 1968, rename Sandcaster on 14 December 1968. worked Vietnam, hit Mine on Cua Viet River, Vietnam with 7 Vietnam crew killed on 25 February 1971, remove Navy on 1 September 1972. scrap on 21 February 1973.
YSD 65 Worked 13th Naval District at NAS Tongue Point, removed Navy on 15 June 1974, sold 7 April 1975 to WIlliam H. Weber, Long Beach, CA, as Hiawatha (ON 565326) in 1976, out of service in 2005

Steel barges

Soule Steel built steel barges for the US Navy for World War 2, a Type B ship.

See also
 California during World War II
 Maritime history of California

References

American boat builders
Manufacturing companies established in 1911
Defunct shipbuilding companies of the United States